Kelechi Keith Ayo Osemele (born June 24, 1989) is an American football offensive guard who is a free agent. He played college football at Iowa State. He was selected by the Baltimore Ravens in the second round of the 2012 NFL Draft, and was a rookie starter throughout the team's Super Bowl XLVII championship run that season.

Early years
Of Nigerian descent, his name Kelechi means "Thank God" in the Igbo language.
Osemele was born and raised in Houston, where he attended Langham Creek High School.

College career
Osemele attended and played college football at Iowa State. Entering his senior season at Iowa State in 2011, Osemele had started 30 consecutive games. He was a second-team all Big 12 selection in 2009 and an honorable mention in 2010.

Professional career

Baltimore Ravens

Osemele was selected in the second round with 60th overall pick in the 2012 NFL Draft by the Baltimore Ravens. He started at right tackle in every Ravens game during his rookie season. He replaced the injured Jah Reid at left guard for the Ravens' playoff run. This, along with the insertion of Bryant McKinnie at left tackle and the move of Michael Oher to right tackle, solidified the offensive line. With the Ravens finishing 10–6, the team won the AFC North pennant and eventually won Super Bowl XLVII over the San Francisco 49ers, making Osemele's rookie year successful giving him his first championship title.

On November 1, 2013, it was announced Osemele would have back surgery. After playing seven games, he would finish the rest of the 2013 season on injured reserve.

Osemele successfully recovered from back surgery and started all but two games for the Ravens in the 2014 season.

Oakland Raiders

Osemele signed a five-year, $60 million contract with the Oakland Raiders on March 10, 2016. He was selected to his first Pro Bowl for the 2016 season along with fellow Raider offensive linemen Donald Penn and Rodney Hudson. He was also named First-team All-Pro. He was also ranked 95th on the NFL Top 100 Players of 2017.

On December 19, 2017, Osemele was named to his second Pro Bowl along with fellow Raider offensive linemen Donald Penn and Rodney Hudson for the second straight year.

As of October 2018, he was the second-highest paid left guard in the NFL in average salary at $11.7 million, behind the Jaguars' Andrew Norwell ($13.3 million) and ahead of the Tampa Bay Buccaneers' Ali Marpet ($10.825 million).

New York Jets
On March 10, 2019, the Raiders agreed to trade Osemele and a 2019 sixth round draft pick (originally acquired from the Chicago Bears) to the New York Jets in exchange for a fifth round pick. The deal was completed on March 14, 2019. On October 15, 2019, it was revealed that Osemele suffered a shoulder injury and was contemplating surgery. Osemele’s doctors told him that he needed surgery for his injury but the Jets disagreed and did not believe that Osemele needed surgery. Osemele was fined for every practice that he missed due to his injury. On October 26, 2019, Osemele was released from the team after undergoing shoulder surgery.

Kansas City Chiefs
On July 27, 2020, Osemele signed a one-year deal with the Kansas City Chiefs. He started the first five games at left guard before suffering torn tendons in both his knees in Week 5. He was placed on injured reserve on October 17, 2020.

References

External links

 
 NFL Combine bio
 Kansas City Chiefs bio
 Oakland Raiders bio
 Baltimore Ravens bio
 Iowa State Cyclones bio

1989 births
Living people
American people of Igbo descent
American sportspeople of Nigerian descent
Igbo sportspeople
Players of American football from Houston
American football offensive guards
American football offensive tackles
Iowa State Cyclones football players
Baltimore Ravens players
Oakland Raiders players
New York Jets players
American Conference Pro Bowl players
Kansas City Chiefs players